The following pages indicate list of films produced in Pakistan by languages.

Film by language

Bengali
 List of Pakistani Bengali films (1956–1971)

Urdu
 List of Urdu-language films

Pashto
 List of Pashto-language films

Punjabi
 List of Pakistani Punjabi-language films

Sindhi
 List of Sindhi-language films

English
 List of English-language Pakistani films

External links
 Search Pakistani film - IMDB.com